Harmonyville is a populated place situated in Warwick Township in Chester County, Pennsylvania, United States.

References

Unincorporated communities in Chester County, Pennsylvania
Unincorporated communities in Pennsylvania